S35 may refer to:

Aviation 
 Beechcraft S35 Bonanza, an American general aviation aircraft
 Okanogan Legion Airport, in Okanogan County, Washington, United States
 Short S.35 Shetland, a British seaplane 
 Sikorsky S-35, an American sesquiplane

Naval vessels 
 , a torpedo boat of the Imperial German Navy
 
 , a submarine of the United States Navy

Other uses 
 S35 (Long Island bus), New York
 S35 (ZVV), a regional railway line of the Zürich S-Bahn
 Jinbei S35, a Chinese SUV
 S35: This material and its container must be disposed of in a safe way, a safety phrase
 Section 35 of the Constitution Act, 1982, Canada
 SOMUA S35, a French cavalry tank of the Second World War
 Sulfur-35, an isotope of sulfur
 S35, a postcode district in Sheffield, England

See also
 SS-35 (disambiguation)
 35S (disambiguation)